Helen Gregory (born 1946) is a prominent historian, author and retired public servant in and of Brisbane, Queensland Australia and its surrounds.

She holds a BA (Hons) from the University of Queensland and is a former adjunct professor of that institution.

In 1969 Helen Gregory was the first Queensland woman to be offered a Rotary Overseas Postgraduate Scholarship, but was unable to take up the award.

In the mid 1970s she was a consultant historian to the private and government sectors, and is believed to be the first graduate historian in Queensland to use her training in this way, demonstrating that privately commissioned histories could be undertaken without sacrificing academic standards or ethical integrity. She was the founder of the Brisbane History Group and the Professional Historians' Association (Queensland), the professional association which promotes the interests of consulting historians in Queensland, and maintains standards of practice. As well as commissioned history, Ms Gregory is the author or co-author of many academic articles and studies and several entries in the Australian Dictionary of Biography.

Ms Gregory became the first Chair of the Queensland Heritage Council in 1992, and subsequently became Director, Cultural Heritage in the Queensland Government's Environment and Heritage department (later renamed the Environmental Protection Agency, the first woman to be appointed to a senior executive position in that department.

In 2005 and subsequent years, Ms Gregory has been a judge of the History Book Award for the Queensland Premier's Literary Awards. In 2006 Ms Gregory was a member of the independent panel that suggested the name for the Eleanor Schonell Bridge to the Lord Mayor of Brisbane and in November 2007 she was appointed to the board of trustees of Newstead House, one of Queensland's oldest and most important cultural heritage sites.

Ms Gregory is married to prominent Brisbane solicitor Scott Gregory. Together they have three adult sons and, as of 2015, six grandchildren.

Publications
Works by Helen Gregory include:

 
 

 With a foreword by The Archbishop of Brisbane, the Most Reverend Felix Arnott.

References

1946 births
Living people
University of Queensland alumni
Academic staff of the University of Queensland
Cultural historians